The Videoscandals were political scandals in Mexico in 2004 when videos of prominent politicians taken with hidden cameras were made public. The majority of them involved politicians in corrupt dealings with former business man Carlos Ahumada, and another showed a politician spending money in Las Vegas.

The videos 
The videos are listed in order of chronological appearance on television.

Jorge Emilio González
The first video shown on national television was of Jorge Emilio González Martínez the Ecologist Green Party of Mexico (PVEM) leader (a long time ally of the PRI party). He was taped by one of his own party members, who introduced to him the businessman interested in the project, allegedly negotiating a $2 million bribe in cash to assist in the development of a hotel in an ecologically protected area. The three met in the PVEM headquarters.

During an interview with Grupo Reforma, Emilio talked about some accusations: his involvement with a Bulgarian woman death, which happened inside one of his properties located in Emerald, Cancún

Gustavo Ponce
Mexico City's finance chief, Gustavo Ponce, was filmed gambling at the Bellagio Hotel in Las Vegas, Nevada, USA.

René Bejarano
The second scandal came when René Bejarano, previously López Obrador's personal secretary, later elected to the Mexico City legislature, was videotaped accepting USD $45,000 in cash. The video got to the hands of Congress member Federico Döring who took it and had it shown on March 3, 2004 at Victor Trujillo's news program (which he hosted as his Brozo character).

References 

2004 in Mexico
2004 in politics
2005 in Mexico
2005 in politics
2006 in Mexico
2006 in politics
Modern Mexico
Political scandals in Mexico
Party of the Democratic Revolution